Shenda Román (born 4 August 1928) is a Chilean actress best known for playing leading roles opposite Nelson Villagra in the "New Chilean Cinema" (1968-1973) of directors Raúl Ruiz and Miguel Littín.

Selected filmography
 Three Sad Tigers (1968)
 Jackal of Nahueltoro (1969)
 Nobody Said Anything (1971)
 The Promised Land (1973)
 Cantata de Chile (1976)
 Presencia lejana (1982)
 Voice Over (2014)
 The Mother of the Lamb (2014)

References

External links

1928 births
Living people
20th-century Chilean actresses
21st-century Chilean actresses
Chilean film actresses
Chilean television actresses
Chilean telenovela actresses